Child on the Open Road (German: Kinder der Landstraße) is a 1919 German silent film directed by Richard Eichberg and starring Fred Goebel, Leontine Kühnberg and Kurt Halden.

The film's sets were designed by the art director Willi Herrmann.

Cast
 Fred Goebel
 Leontine Kühnberg
 Kurt Halden
 Carl Gerhard Schröder
 Frau Lehndorf-Schöttle
 Hermann Vallentin

References

Bibliography
 Bock, Hans-Michael & Bergfelder, Tim. The Concise CineGraph. Encyclopedia of German Cinema. Berghahn Books, 2009.

External links

1919 films
Films of the Weimar Republic
Films directed by Richard Eichberg
German silent feature films
German black-and-white films
1910s German films